TA is the sixth album by Trans Am, released in 2002.

Track listing
Cold War - 4:16
Molecules - 3:03
Run With Me - 3:48
Bonn - 2:55
Basta - 1:36
Different Kind of Love - 3:42
You Will Be There - 3:12
Derek Fisher - 0:32
Party Station - 3:56
Positive People - 3:53
Afternight - 4:34
C Sick - 5:13
Feed On Me - 3:33
Infinite Wavelength - 3:37

References

2002 albums
Trans Am (band) albums
Thrill Jockey albums